Bailu Township is a township under the administration of Anding District, Dingxi, Gansu, China. , it has seven villages under its administration:
Lufeng Village
Huajian Village
Zhuainian Village
Qianjin Village
Tianjiacha Village
Zhongshan Village
Fuxing Village

References 

Township-level divisions of Gansu
Dingxi